This is a list of past and present regional animation festivals. These festivals include only animation and generally limit their submissions to a particular region of the world, or even a single country. They often show a program of independent, student, and commercial work.

See also 
 List of anime conventions
 List of international animation festivals

 
Animation